Disjointed is an American television sitcom created by David Javerbaum and Chuck Lorre and starring Kathy Bates. Twenty episodes of the series were ordered from Warner Bros. by Netflix, with the first 10 episodes premiering on August 25, 2017. The last 10 episodes were released on January 12, 2018. On February 14, 2018, Netflix canceled the series. It is noteworthy as their first original multi-cam sitcom.

Plot
After decades of advocating for legalized cannabis usage, Ruth Whitefeather Feldman (Kathy Bates) employs her newly graduated son and a team of young budtenders to help run her Los Angeles cannabis dispensary. Along the way, Ruth and the team run into "highs" and lows. Delving into marijuana history, activism, 4/20, misconceptions about stoners, and the personal lives of the whole team, the show touches on serious issues such as post-traumatic stress disorder and highlights the medicinal benefits of the marijuana plant.

Cast

Main
 Kathy Bates as Ruth Whitefeather Feldman
 Aaron Moten as Travis Feldman, Ruth's son
 Elizabeth Alderfer as Olivia, a budtender and love interest of Travis
 Tone Bell as Carter, the security guard who has PTSD from three tours in Iraq
 Elizabeth Ho as Jenny, a budtender
 Dougie Baldwin as Pete, the in-store grower
 Betsy Sodaro as Deborah "Dabby" Shapiro, a frequent customer of Ruth's Alternative Caring and Dank's girlfriend
 Chris Redd as Steve "Dank" Dankerson, a frequent customer of Ruth's Alternative Caring and Dabby's boyfriend

Recurring
 Nicole Sullivan as Maria Sherman, one of the dispensary's customers.
 Michael Trucco as Tae Kwon Doug, a neighbor who owns a Tae Kwon Do studio.
 Cass Buggé as Sabine Dortmunder, a CNNN reporter.
 Peter Riegert as Walter, a dispensary customer and love interest of Ruth.
 Ken Marino as Angelo DeStevens, a cannabis entrepreneur based on Steve DeAngelo.
 Lateefah Holder as Cheryl, a dispensary customer and developer of "Pot Coin"
 Missi Pyle as Mary Jane
 Elizabeth Sung as Lianmin
 Harry Groener as Judge Nelson  
 Jessica Tuck as Ms. Carol Harris

Guest
 Richard Kind as Special Agent Barry Schwartz
 Cheech Marin & Tommy Chong as Themselves
 Alicia Witt as Rosie Bush
 Brian Baumgartner as Krinkles
 Rondi Reed as Nana
 Leonardo Nam as Jesus Bruce Lee Christ

Episodes

Production
In December 2016, Jessica Lu's role was recast with Elizabeth Ho taking on the role.

Reception
 On Metacritic, the series has a weighted average score of 43 out of 100, based on reviews from 22 critics, indicating "mixed or average reviews".

References

External links
Disjointed on Netflix

2017 American television series debuts
2018 American television series endings
2010s American sitcoms
American television series about cannabis
American television series with live action and animation
English-language Netflix original programming
Television shows set in Los Angeles
Television series by Warner Bros. Television Studios
Television series created by Chuck Lorre